Hotel Hans Egede is a four-star hotel in Nuuk, Greenland. It is named after Hans Egede and is the largest hotel in Nuuk. The hotel is located on the main street, Aqqusinersuaq.

It has 140 rooms and 10 apartments and is commonly used for conferences. There are two restaurants in the hotel, Restaurant Sarfalik and A Hereford Beefstouw. The hotel has one bar, the Skyline Bar, which is located on the top floor and which has a view over Nuuk. The hotel can accommodate conferences of up to 350 people.

See also
 List of hotels in Greenland

References

External links
Official site

Hotels in Greenland
Buildings and structures in Nuuk